Music and Friends is an album by the Walter Ostanek Band. In 1995, the album won Ostanek the Grammy Award for Best Polka Album.

References

1994 albums
Grammy Award for Best Polka Album
Polka albums